Reiner Kurth (born 20 July 1951) is an East German sprint canoeist who competed in the early 1970s. He won a gold medal in the K-2 1000 m event at the 1971 ICF Canoe Sprint World Championships in Belgrade.

Kurth also finished fourth in the K-2 1000 m event at the 1972 Summer Olympics in Munich.

References

Sports-reference.com profile

1951 births
Canoeists at the 1972 Summer Olympics
German male canoeists
Living people
Olympic canoeists of East Germany
ICF Canoe Sprint World Championships medalists in kayak